Psalm 146 in A major (WAB 37) by Anton Bruckner is a psalm setting for double mixed choir, soloists and orchestra. It is a setting of verses 1 to 11 of a German version of Psalm 147, which is Psalm 146 in the Vulgata.

History 

It is not known what occasion prompted Bruckner to compose this large-scale work or whether there was any performance in Bruckner's lifetime. When it was written, for whom, and why it was allowed to languish unperformed are all unanswered questions. Its cantata-like structure ... and stylistic affinity with the Missa solemnis place it in the late St. Florian years, though its enormous dimensions ... are difficult to reconcile with the resources of the monastery.

A sketch of the work is stored in the archive of Wels. An incomplete manuscript and a completed copy with annotations are stored in the archive of the Österreichische Nationalbibliothek.

The first performance of Bruckner's Psalm 146 by Wolfgang Riedelbauch with the Hans-Sachs-Chor, the Lehrergesangverein Nürnberg and the Nürnberger Symphoniker occurred in the Meistersingerhalle of Nürnberg on 28 November 1971. Six months later another performance by the same ensembles was recorded in the Colosseum-Studio and put on LP. Other performances occurred in May 1975.A second wave of performances occurred about twenty years later by Heinz Wallberg with the Niederösterreichiches Tonkünstler Orchester, the choir of the Wirtschaftsuniversität Wien and the Kammerchor der Musikhochschule Wien, first in Vienna on 8, 10 and 11 November 1991 and on 13 November in Baden bei Biel, Switzerland.The American premiere by Leon Botstein with the American Symphony Orchestra and the Canticum Novum Singers occurred about three years later, in the Alice Tully Hall on 13 January 1995. The American premiere used the score prepared by Hawkshaw for the Bruckner's .Twenty years later, during the 25th Ebrach Summer Music Festival, a next performance by Gerd Schaller with the Philharmonie Festiva orchestra and the Philharmonic Choir of Munich occurred on 6 September 2015. Schaller's live performance is put on CD by Profil Hänssler.

Recordings of Wallberg's and Botstein's live performances are put in the Bruckner archive.

Text 
 (Praise God for his well-doings)

Setting 
Psalm 146 is the largest of Bruckner's psalm settings. The 652-bar long work in A major is scored for  choir and  soloists and orchestra (1 flute, 2 oboes, 2 clarinets, 2 bassoons, 4 horns, 2 trumpets, 4 trombones, timpani and strings). The work (total duration about 30 minutes) is divided into six parts:
Introduction: "Alleluja! Lobet den Herrn". Langsam, A major – Choir with soprano soloist and solo horn
Recitative: F sharp minor veering to D major
"Der Herr bauet Jerusalem". Kräftig – Bass soloist and trombones
"Er heilet die geschlagenen Herzens sind". Weich – Soprano soloist and horns
"Er zählet die Menge der Sterne". Frisch – Tenor soloist and woodwinds (oboes & bassoons)
Choir: "Groß ist unser Herr". Schnell, D minor veering to D major – Double choir in antiphony
Arioso with Choir: 
Arioso: "Der Herr nimmt auf die Sanften". Nicht zu langsam, B flat major – Soprano, tenor and alto soloists, with solo oboe and violin
Choir: "Singet dem Herrn mit Danksagung". Etwas bewegter, E flat major
Bridging arioso:
"Er läßt Gras wachsen auf den Bergen" – Soprano soloist
"Er gibt dem Vieh seine Speise" – Tenor soloist with solo clarinet
"Er hat nicht Lust an der Stärke des Rosses" – Bass soloist with solo bassoon, veering to E minor
Arioso: "Der Herr hat Wohlgefallen an denen, die ihn fürchten". Nicht schnell, E major – Soprano soloist
Finale with Fugue: "Alleluja! Lobet den Herrn", A major
Final choir: Etwas schnell
Fugue: Nicht schnell – Choir with soloists at the end

As in the Missa solemnis there are clear influences of Haydn and Schubert, particularly in the ariosos. There are in the Finale two passages with brass instrument chords followed by an Alleluja, for which Bruckner drew his inspiration from the Hallelujah of Händel's Messiah, on which he often improvised on organ.

For the first time Bruckner is using a full orchestra, with yet some archaism such as the use of horns (part 4) and trombones (part 6) in homophony with the choir. "[The] closing Alleluja ... is Bruckner's most extended fugue prior to the Fifth Symphony." The five-minute long fugue is more mature than the quite formal fugues of Bruckner's previous works – a consequence of Sechter's tuition. Bruckner uses, e.g., an inversion of the theme in its development. 
Psalm 146 is also remarkable as the first piece in which Bruckner experimented with organic thematic integration on a large scale ... [It] also deserves to be heard more often for the lovely string pianissimo in its opening bars that foreshadows the beginning of both the D minor and F minor Masses.

Discography 
There are two publicly available recordings:
 Wolfgang Riedelbauch, Anton Bruckner – Psalm 146 and Windhaager Messe, Hans Sachs-Chor, Lehrergesangverein Nürnberg (in double choir) and Nürnberger Symphoniker, LP-Colosseum SM 548, 1972. The recording used a score made by Riedelbauch-self, based on a copyist's manuscript.This historical recording of Psalm 146 has been transferred to CD, together with that of the Requiem by Hans Michael Beuerle: Klassic Haus KHCD-2011-092, 2011.
 Gerd Schaller, Bruckner – Mass 3, Psalm 146, Organ works, Philharmonischer Chor München and Philharmonie Festiva, CD: Profil Hänssler PH16034, 2015.The sound by Schaller is wider and also more detailed ... There is only one downer: The double choir of the third movement is only clearly audible and unfolds its effect by Riedelbauch. By Schaller it can at best be guessed.

References

Sources 
 Cornelis van Zwol, Anton Bruckner – Leven en Werken, Thot, Bussum (Netherlands), 2012. 
 John Williamson, The Cambridge Companion to Bruckner, Cambridge University Press, 2004. 
 Uwe Harten, Anton Bruckner. Ein Handbuch. , Salzburg, 1996. .
 Anton Bruckner – Sämtliche Werke, Band XX/4: Psalm 146 (1856–1858), Musikwissenschaftlicher Verlag der Internationalen Bruckner-Gesellschaft, Paul Hawkshaw (Editor), Vienna, 1996

External links 
 
 Psalm 146 A-Dur, WAB 37 (1845-1858?) Critical discography by Hans Roelofs  
 Live performance by Heinz Wallberg in the Großer Musikvereinssaal Vienna (10 November 1991)

Psalms by Anton Bruckner
Choral compositions
Compositions in A major